Huntersville is a large suburban town in Mecklenburg County, North Carolina, United States. A part of the Charlotte metropolitan area, the population was 61,376 at the 2020 census, making Huntersville the 15th largest municipality in North Carolina.

Etymology
Originally named Craighead, the town was renamed to honor Robert Boston Hunter, a local cotton farmer and land owner.

Geography

Huntersville is located 14 miles north of uptown Charlotte.

Demographics

2020 census

As of the 2020 United States census, there were 61,376 people, 20,074 households, and 14,960 families residing in the town.

2010 census
As of the 2010 census, there were 46,773 people, 9,171 households, and 6,859 families residing in the town. The population density was 801.4 people per square mile (309.4/km). There were 9,859 housing units at an average density of 316.5 per square mile (122.2/km). The racial makeup of the town was 88.42% White, 7.47% African American, 0.37% Native American, 1.50% Asian, 0.05% Pacific Islander, 1.06% from other races, and 1.13% from two or more races. Hispanic or Latino of any race were 3.88% of the population.

There were 9,171 households, out of which 41.9% had children under the age of 18 living with them, 64.6% were married couples living together, 7.5% had a female householder with no husband present, and 25.2% were non-families. 19.2% of all households were made up of individuals, and 3.4% had someone living alone who was 65 years of age or older. The average household size was 2.67 and the average family size was 3.09.

Despite the rapid growth and 9,171 households, and 6,859 families as of 2010, crime remained relatively low.

In the town, the population was spread out, with 28.3% under the age of 18, 6.2% from 18 to 24, 40.7% from 25 to 44, 18.6% from 45 to 64, and 6.2% who were 65 years of age or older. The median age was 33 years. For every 100 females, there were 97.6 males. For every 100 females age 18 and over, there were 96.0 males.

The median income for a household in the town was $71,932, and the median income for a family was $80,821 (these figures had risen to $80,328 and $90,739 respectively as of a 2007.) Males had a median income of $53,553 versus $33,877 for females. The per capita income for the town was $30,256. 3.1% of the population and 1.9% of families were below the poverty line.

Economy
Joe Gibbs Racing is based in Huntersville. The team has five NASCAR Cup Series drivers championships with Bobby Labonte, Tony Stewart and Kyle Busch, and has won over 190 Cup races.

Arts and culture

Museums
 Discovery Place Kids-Huntersville
 EnergyExplorium at McGuire Nuclear Station
 Holly Bend
 Hugh Torance House & Store
 Latta Plantation

Festivals and events
The Carolina Renaissance Festival operates Saturdays and Sundays in October and November.

Library

Huntersville and the surrounding area is served by the North County Regional branch of the Public Library of Charlotte and Mecklenburg County.

Parks and recreation
The town also is known recreationally as a lake community because of its proximity to Lake Norman, a large man-made lake created by Duke Power to serve the nuclear power plant, and Mountain Island Lake, a smaller man-made lake that is used as Charlotte's city water source and located along the southwest border of Huntersville. The lakes attract both boaters and water-skiers from several surrounding states. Huntersville is also home to one private golf course, NorthStone Country Club and two Semi-Private courses; Skybrook Golf Club and Birkdale Golf Course.

Government
The town is governed by an elected Mayor and a Board of Commissioners and elections are officially conducted on a non-partisan basis. Elections are held every two years with the Mayor and Commissioners being elected separately. There is no primary election for either Mayor or the Board of Commissioners. Voters are allowed to vote for up to six Commissioner candidates and the six candidates receiving the highest number of votes are elected.

The current Mayor and Town Board after the November 2, 2021 election: Mayor Melinda Bales and Commissioners Stacy Phillips, Amber Kovacs, Dan Boone, Derek Partee, Rob Kidwell, and Lance Munger. Stacy Phillips received the highest number of votes for commissioner with 3,715 and is the current Mayor Pro Tem.

Education
School age children in Huntersville attending public schools are part of the Charlotte-Mecklenburg Schools system.

Elementary schools
 Barnette Elementary
 Legette Blythe Elementary
 Huntersville Elementary
 Torrence Creek Elementary
 Grand Oak Elementary
 Long Creek Elementary School
 Hornets Nest Elementary School
 Trillium Springs Montessori

Middle schools
 John M. Alexander Middle School
 Francis Bradley Middle
 Bailey Middle in Cornelius has an attendance boundary that includes a section of Huntersville

High schools
 Hopewell High School
 North Mecklenburg High School
 William A. Hough High School in Cornelius has a boundary that includes a section of Huntersville.

Charter schools
 Lake Norman Charter School
 Bonnie Cone Classical Academy

Private schools
 Children's Community School
 SouthLake Christian Academy
 St Mark Catholic School
Christ the King Catholic High School
 Cannon School

Post secondary
 Central Piedmont Community College (Merancas Campus)

Media
The town is served by six weekly newspapers, including The Herald Citizen.

Infrastructure

Transportation
Huntersville is one of three towns (the others are Cornelius and Davidson) located north of Charlotte, North Carolina, but still within Mecklenburg County. These three towns make up the area known as "North Meck." in northern Mecklenburg County. Express bus transportation and an interstate with HOV lanes that ends five miles south of Huntersville provide access to the downtown business areas of Charlotte.

Two exits from Interstate 77 serve Huntersville. Exit 23 (Gilead Road) connects the expressway with the original town. Exit 25 (North Carolina Highway 73, but most often referred to as Sam Furr Road) provides access to the Birkdale Village area and shopping, medical, and office complexes that have been built since the exit opened.

U.S. Highway 21 (Statesville Road) and North Carolina Highway 115 (Old Statesville Road) are the two main north–south arterial roads through the town. These two routes complement I-77 south to Charlotte and north to Mooresville and Statesville, which are both in adjacent Iredell County.

Notable people
 Elizabeth Bradford, painter
 Harrison Burton, NASCAR driver
 Chris Cole, Libertarian Party activist in North Carolina
 Luke Combs, Country singer and songwriter
 Brandyn Curry, professional basketball player
 Blake Koch, NASCAR driver and businessman
 Luke Maye, professional basketball player, 2017 NCAA champion with North Carolina
 Cameron Moore, Christian pop singer/songwriter
 Bailey Ober, MLB pitcher
 Elliot Panicco, professional soccer player
 Reneé Rapp, actress and singer
 Ryder Ryan, baseball player
 Drew P. Saunders, former member of the North Carolina General Assembly
 Ben Shields, former Major League Baseball pitcher
 Andrea Stinson, former WNBA player
 Daniel Suárez, NASCAR driver 
 Jim Vandiver, NASCAR Winston Cup Series driver from 1968 to 1983
 Hoyt Wilhelm, Major League Baseball pitcher and member of the National Baseball Hall of Fame

See also 
 List of municipalities in North Carolina

References

External links

 
 

Towns in Mecklenburg County, North Carolina
Towns in North Carolina